Artur Filipe Bernardes Moreira (born 18 February 1984), known simply as Artur, is a Portuguese footballer who plays for S.C. Beira-Mar as an attacking midfielder.

He amassed Primeira Liga totals of 187 matches and 13 goals over nine seasons, at the service of Beira-Mar, Marítimo and Arouca. He also played professionally in Ukraine, with Chornomorets.

Club career
Born in Cacia, Aveiro, Artur joined S.C. Beira-Mar as a 16-year-old. He made his Primeira Liga debut with the local club on 12 December 2004 in a 1–3 home loss against Moreirense F.C. where he came on as a late substitute, one of just three appearances during the relegation-ending season.

In the 2009–10 campaign, Artur scored eight goals to help the team return to the top division as champions under Leonardo Jardim. The following two, he totalled a further nine.

On 1 January 2013, following a very brief spell in the Ukrainian Premier League with FC Chornomorets Odesa, Artur was loaned to C.S. Marítimo of the Portuguese top tier. On 9 June 2014, he signed a permanent two-year contract at F.C. Arouca of the same league, scoring his only goal for the latter side on 2 April 2016 in a 3–2 home victory over Académica de Coimbra.

Artur returned to Beira-Mar aged 33, with the club now in the regional championships.

References

External links

1984 births
Living people
People from Aveiro, Portugal
Sportspeople from Aveiro District
Portuguese footballers
Association football midfielders
Primeira Liga players
Liga Portugal 2 players
Segunda Divisão players
S.C. Beira-Mar players
G.D. Gafanha players
C.S. Marítimo players
F.C. Arouca players
Ukrainian Premier League players
FC Chornomorets Odesa players
Portuguese expatriate footballers
Expatriate footballers in Ukraine
Portuguese expatriate sportspeople in Ukraine
A.A. Avanca players